The AWA International Television Championship was a short-lived title in the American Wrestling Association from 1987 to 1989. It was filled with a several months long tournament and was defended on their television broadcast on ESPN.

As explained by Larry Nelson on the AWA Championship Wrestling show on ESPN, the first two wrestlers in the tournament to reach 50 points (with 5 points being awarded or deducted for a pinfall or submission victory or loss, and 2.5 points being awarded or deducted for a countout or disqualification victory or loss) faced off in the finals to determine the first champion.

Title history

.

References

American Wrestling Association championships
Television wrestling championships